Apti Magomedov (born 16 September 1968) is a Moldovan judoka.

Achievements

References

1968 births
Living people
Moldovan male judoka
20th-century Moldovan people